Vilcabamba may refer to:

 Vilcabamba, Peru, capital and last stronghold of the Neo-Inca state from 1539 to 1572 
 Vilcabamba, Ecuador, town in the province of Loja in southern Ecuador
 Vilcabamba District, La Convención, one of eleven districts of the La Convención Province in the Cusco Region in Peru
 "Vilcabamba" (short story), 2010 science-fiction story by Harry Turtledove